Bernard Murphy was a Scottish professional footballer who played as a winger. In the 1905–06 season, he played six matches in the English Football League for Burnley, scoring two goals.

References

Year of birth unknown
Scottish footballers
Association football midfielders
Burnley F.C. players
English Football League players
Year of death missing